Rémy Roy (born 1958), known as The Minitel Killer, is a French serial killer who killed three gay men from 1990 to 1991 out of a self-admitted hatred towards homosexuals. He earned his nickname due to the fact that he messaged prospective victims through the "pink Minitel" (a term referring to the use of the Minitel, a telephone-based French Videotex, for erotic purposes) and offering to engage in BDSM in order to lure them.

Biography 
Rémy Roy was born in an indeterminate region of France in 1958. He grew up pampered by his parents and studied at a religious school, the Brothers of Saint-Vincent de Paul, but was considered a mediocre student. After graduating, he went to a sailing school and eventually became a skipper, with his profession allowing him to meet people such as Florence Arthaud, Philippe Poupon and Olivier de Kersauson, and even worked with a close companion of Nicolas Hulot. During this time, he also met his future wife, Françoise, the owner of a local bookstore, whom he later married and moved in with at a house in Villejuif, where they soon had two children together.

According to Roy's wife, he was a kind, generous father who always looked after his family and even actively helped her run the bookstore, refusing to accept a salary for his efforts. This changed in 1988, when his wife hired a friend to help out, which left Roy with nothing to do. Now left with much free time, he decided to open a promotional video company based in his home, but this failed to generate any interest. Due to the failure of his business, Roy became depressed and started spending most of his time in bed eating, eventually growing to 120 kilograms in size. Around this time, he started to frequently use Minitel, spending more and more time on it, up to several hours a day.

Murders and investigation
On the afternoon of October 11, 1990, Roy made an appointment with 46-year-old insurance agent Paul Bernard to meet up at a marina in Draveil, near the edge of the Seine. Bernard lived in Issy-les-Moulineaux with his widowed, retired mother and frequently used his Minitel to look for hook-ups to satiate his masochistic tendencies. After allowing Roy to gag him with a scarf, tie his hands behind his back and his testicles with a string,  he was left to suffocate before Roy crushed his head with a large stone. Bernard's naked body was found on the following morning by a fisherman, with a pair of pants covering his head. His car was found in a parking lot about a kilometer away from the marina. An autopsy determined that he had been asphyxiated or strangled, as there were traces of a tie around his neck.

During the night of October 19 to 20, Roy went to the house of 48-year-old Gilbert Duquesnoy, an astrologer who lived in Champigny-sur-Marne and practiced under the name "Nathaniel the Magician". Like the previous victim, he used the Minitel to look to cruise for people who would indulge into his masochistic tendencies. The pair eventually went to Duquesnoy's office in Paris's 9th arrondissement, where they drank a few glasses of port wine before Roy covered his sex partner's head with a leather hood and tied his ankles and hands behind his back. Now left with nothing to defend himself, Roy proceeded to hit Duquesnoy at least seven times on the head with a hammer, which he then stole along with the glass of wine, his victim's diary and address books, and promptly leaving the apartment. For some time, Duquesnoy's dachshund followed him, but eventually returned to the apartment. Roy eventually threw the hammer into the Marne and later disposed of the remaining items at the Nogent-sur-Marne station. Approximately two days later, Alain, Duquesnoy's partner, asked some neighbors to go and check on him since he was not answering his phone calls. After entering the apartment, they found the man lying naked on his bed, an open briefcase with sex toys next to him, and the house ransacked. 

On November 17, at about 11 AM, Roy went to the home of 41-year-old Hugues Moreau, the manager of a walling company based in Paris. Soon after, Roy smashed Moreau's skull using a large metal tap before stealing his checkbooks, bank cards and a fax machine. Moreau's wife discovered his body about two hours later, with the man being naked, his limbs bound and a chain tied around his waist. A bag full of BDSM-related items was found next to the bed. While an investigation was going on concerning this murder, Roy bought an underwater camcorder using the money he had stolen from Moreau's apartment.

Attempted murder and identification
On October 8, 1991, Roy went to the house of 32-year-old Bruno Giraudon, a civil servant living in Villeneuve-Saint-Georges who was looking for a companion and possible lover on Minitel. After drinking and talking for some time, Roy told Giraudon that he was a photographer specializing in the sailing world, and claimed that he was adept at sadomasochistic practices. He then took out his bag and showed some of his equipment as an offer to try it out, but surprisingly, Giraudon refused. Upon hearing this, Roy hit him on the head with a lamp stand, causing him to faint. Deciding to leave him for dead, Roy stole his checkbook and identity papers, leaving the accessories behind. Giraudon's friends later found him naked and covered in blood, in an apparent comatose state, and quickly drove him to the nearest hospital. He eventually recovered three days later, and gave a description of his assailant to authorities.

The following month, Roy went to a video store and bought a flatbed editor and a VCR, saying to the clerk that he had a camcorder for underwater filming and wanted an editor that was compatible with it. The price amounted to 14,000 francs, requiring that he provide an ID, for which Roy paid with Giraudon's money and used his identity to present himself. A few hours later, he makes another purchase in another video store using the exact same method, but this time, he was recorded on the store's surveillance cameras. Eventually, investigators managed to obtain the surveillance footage and supplied still images to several editors of newspapers specialised in sailing. This idea led to the editor-in-chief of Neptune Yachting, Alain Coroller, to identify the man on the footage as Rémy Roy.

Arrest, trial and imprisonment
On November 28, 1991, Roy was arrested at his home in Villejuif, with investigators finding Giraudon's checkbook and driver's license in his parka. While incarcerated in Fresnes Prison, he confessed responsibility for the crimes and explained in great detail what had transpired, but denied being gay and claimed that the had killed each victim because he was a homophobe. When interviewed by psychiatrist Jean Martel and psychologist Caroline Legendre, Roy made several revelations about his life that attracted interest: he claimed that he suffered a lot from the absences of his father, who travelled a lot, and was frequently whipped with a leather strap by his mother. As for his homophobia, Roy claimed several incidents led him to develop a seething hatred towards gay men:

 when he was young, he was tied by the arm to a tree branch by some classmates, who then stripped him naked
 at age 13, he went watch a movie in a theatre, but the man sitting next to him accidentally ejaculated on him while masturbating.
 at age 17, while working as an apprentice repairman at an electronics shop, he was asked by a group of friends to repay them their money, as they thought that he charged too much for his services. When he was unable to pay, they instead told him to expose himself to an elderly man in a gym, which Roy refused to do and instead ran away. Angered by his refusal, the men then tracked him down and collectively gang raped him.

The authorities investigated each and every single one of these claims, finding that none of them had actually happened and that these were simply sadomasochistic fantasies that Roy falsely presented as memories. He was soon charged with the two counts of murder (Bernard and Duquesnoy), one count of manslaughter (Moreau) and the attempted murder of Giraudon. On June 26, 1996, Roy's trial began at the cour d'assises in Créteil. After two days of deliberations, he was found guilty on all counts and sentenced to a life term with 18 years of preventative detention.

List of known victims

See also
 List of French serial killers

References

TV documentary 
 "Rémy Roy, The assassin of the Minitel" March 18, 2012 and June 2, 2013 in Get the accused presented by Frédérique Lantieri on France 2.

Radio shows 
 "In the psyche of serial killers" April 21, 2016 in Jacques Pradel's L'Heure du crime on  RTL.

1958 births
20th-century French criminals
French male criminals
French people convicted of murder
French prisoners and detainees
French prisoners sentenced to life imprisonment
French sailors
French serial killers
Living people
Male serial killers
People convicted of murder by France
Prisoners and detainees of France
Prisoners sentenced to life imprisonment by France
Violence against gay men
Violence against men in Europe